Massey University Football Club is an amateur football club in Palmerston North, New Zealand. Their top men's and top women's teams play in their respective Central Football Federation League. Their home ground is at the university campus.

History
Established in 1948, Massey spent their first few years playing in the local Manawatū league and University tournaments before they had a more established presence from 1970 onwards. Traditionally the club had been for students and ex-students from the local Massey University, but they do welcome players that aren't associated with the University now.

The club's best performing team has been the women's team from 2012 to 2015, who played in the Women's Central League, winning the league three times in a row in 2012, 2013 and 2014. As well as having the league's top goalscorer with Emma Boyack winning the award in 2012 and 2013, then Jane Barnett winning in 2014, they also competed in the national Women's Knockout Cup finishing runner's-up in 2012 to Three Kings United and again in 2015 to Glenfield Rovers.

The Men's team has won the New Zealand Universities winter tournament in 1970.

Staff and committee members
Following the 2022 MUFC AGM:
President: Rhys Hardstaff
Secretary: Sam Bolton
Treasurer: Donald Piper
Events: Amy Macaulay

Coaching staff

2022 staff

Honours
Women's Central League - 2004, 2012, 2013, 2014
Women's Knockout Cup runner-up - 2012, 2015
 Kelly Cup - 2013
 Central Football Men's Federation Cup - 2017, 2019, 2021

References

External links 
Club Website
The Ultimate New Zealand Soccer Website Massey University page

Association football clubs in Palmerston North
Association football clubs established in 1948
1948 establishments in New Zealand
Massey University